Circle Lake is a lake in Rice County, in the U.S. state of Minnesota.

Circle Lake was so named for the fact part of the lake forms a rough circle around a lake island.

References

Lakes of Minnesota
Lakes of Rice County, Minnesota